C is a service on the S-train network in Copenhagen. It serves the Klampenborg radial and the inner part of the Frederikssund radial, and also reinforces service on the outer part of the Frederikssund radial in high-traffic period.

Service C is one of the base services on the network, running between Ballerup and Klampenborg every 20 minutes from about 5:00 to 1:00 every day. Between about 6:00 to 19:00 on Monday to Saturday it runs every 10 minutes, and in this period half of the trains continue from Ballerup to Frederikssund. On Friday and Saturday nights there is also a 30 minutes service throughout the night.

History
The C service was created in 1950 when the service between Ballerup and Holte (see service B) was split into two in order to make the timetable correspond better in Vanløse. Ever since then C has been primarily a Ballerup service.

Note that from 1979 to 1989 both Cc and C services ran.

Until 1979, in the time C ran to Ballerup but not to Holte it ordinarily terminated in Hellerup. These trains were routinely extended to Klampenborg on Sundays where the weather was good enough to attract more passengers than the ordinary service could transport.

Between 1972 and 1979 the stopping Ballerup service was called H.

The rush-hour service Cx ran from 1966 to 1993:

S-train (Copenhagen)